Maya Fidawi (Arabic: مايا فداوي), a Lebanese illustrator for children's books since 2004, graduated from the faculty of Arts from American University of Beirut. Some of her work won several Arab awards.

Education and career 
Maya Fidawi studied Fine Arts at the American University of Beirut in 2000. She is fluent in several languages including Arabic, English, French, and Portuguese. Before starting her career as an illustrator of children's books, she worked in different areas including in Decorative drawings and miniatures, and advertising companies where she drew in walls of several homes and palaces in Lebanon, such as the Phoenicia Hotel and Planet Hollywood.

Her career as children's books illustrator started when she participated in a children's painting calendar event with an advertising company. One of the presents in the event was an owner of a publishing house. Delighted by the drawing of Fidawi, the owner contracted with her to illustrator one of her book. Fidawi now has illustrated numerous books inside and outside the Arab world including Lebanon, UAE, Jordan, Morocco, Italy, Brazil, and New York.

Fidawi held numerous illustration workshops for children and professional graphic illustrators in Istanbul, Abu Dhabi, Sharjah, Tangier, and Beirut. Her drawings have also received many awards such as the Etisalat Award for the best drawings under forty books in 2017, for her book “The Seven Day Lamb” which took place in Morocco.

Awards 

 2012: Saudi International Book Fair Award for best illustration.
 2012: Beirut International Book Fair Award for best illustration.
 2013: Arab Though Foundation "Arabi 21" Award for illustration.
 2014: Etisalat Award for Arabic Children's Literature for best drawings.
 2017: Etisalat Award for Arabic Children's Literature for best drawings.

References 

Lebanese illustrators
Lebanese women writers
Lebanese women illustrators
Year of birth missing (living people)
Living people
American University of Beirut alumni